Half Price Books, Records, Magazines, Incorporated is a chain of new and used bookstores in the United States. The company's original motto is "We buy and sell anything printed or recorded except yesterday's newspaper", and many of the used books, music, and movies for sale in each location are purchased from local residents. The corporate office is located in the flagship Northwest Highway location in Dallas, Texas. Half Price Books now operates more than 127 stores (including outlets) in 17 states.

History

Founders Ken Gjemre (1921-2002) and Pat Anderson opened the first store in 1972 in a former laundromat in Dallas, Texas, filling the shelves with 2,000 books out of their personal libraries. Pat Anderson's daughter, Sharon Anderson Wright, is the company's current President and CEO. In 2009, Sharon's sister Ellen O'Neal stepped up to the position of Chairperson of the Board to become more involved with the family business.

Philanthropy
The Half Price Books original mission statement includes the promise to "promote literacy and be kind to the environment." Teachers and librarians, for example, are offered a year-round 10% discount on purchases. Each year, every Half Price Books store holds a book drive to collect new or gently used children's books, building "Half Pint Libraries" at non-profit organizations and schools in the communities it serves.

The company has promoted recycling and reusing, and the sound management of paper, energy and water resources. In 2008, Half Price Books launched a formal environmental education initiative called "B(eco)me Green" to help spread knowledge about the health of the environment.

In addition, the chain donates millions of books and its overstock inventory to non-profit organizations around the world such as Feed the Children and American Red Cross. It also gives some of its books to Better World Books, a for-profit online bookseller.

Publishing
Half Price Books publishes some of the books it sells, inexpensively reprinting non-copyrighted titles or acquiring the U.S. or English language rights from another publisher. Half Price Books reprints these titles under its publishing arm, Hackberry Press.

Among Hackberry Press titles is the Half Price Books children's storybook series Say Good Night to Illiteracy, with 13 editions in print. All proceeds from the series benefit family literacy organizations such as Reach Out and Read and the National Center for Family Literacy project was axed in 2005.

Wholesale
The wholesale division of Half Price Books is Texas Bookman, also headquartered in Dallas. Texas Bookman sells trade and scholarly remainders at discount prices to wholesale buyers around the world.  In April 2020, Texas Bookman began selling directly to the public on their new retail website.  In May 2022, Texas Bookman will host their first trade book show titled Texas Remainder Expo (TRex).  Exhibitors will travel from across the US and UK to show their latest inventory available for wholesale purchasing at discounted prices.

Unionization 
Beginning in 2021, two Half Price Books locations in Minnesota (in Roseville and St. Paul) filed for Union elections. These two stores were joined by another Minnesota location (Coon Rapids) in late 2021, and all three won their Union elections on December 16, 2021, becoming the first three unionized Half Price Books locations. They were shortly joined by a fourth MN location, St. Louis Park, which won their Union election on January 6, 2022.

On April 1, 2022, the Half Price Books in Greenwood, Indiana won their Union election and became the fifth store in the company to unionize.

References

External links

BecomeGreen.org  – an environmental initiative by Half Price Books
DeleteCensorship.org  – a Banned Books Awareness message sponsored by Half Price Books
Official Facebook Page
Texas Bookman Wholesale
Texas Remainder Expo

Bookstores of the United States
Companies based in Dallas
Retail companies established in 1972
Book distributors
American companies established in 1972
1972 establishments in Texas
Used bookstores